Aeshna viridis, the green hawker,  is a species of dragonfly in the family Aeshnidae. It is found in Austria, the Czech Republic, Denmark, Estonia, Finland, Germany, Hungary, Latvia, Lithuania, the Netherlands, Poland, Russia, Serbia and Montenegro, Slovakia, Sweden, and Ukraine. Its natural habitats are rivers, swamps, lakes, and marshes. It is threatened by habitat loss in parts of its range but in general it is not very vulnerable.

References

External links

Photo Aeshna viridis

Aeshnidae
Insects described in 1836
Odonata of Europe
Taxonomy articles created by Polbot